Kyle Bernard Vander-Kuyp (born 30 May 1971 in Paddington, a suburb of Sydney), is an Indigenous Australian athlete of the Worimi and Yuin tribe of North and South Coast New South Wales.  At 5 weeks of age, he was adopted by Pat and Ben Vander-Kuyp.

Kyle bettered the Oceanian record in the 110 metres hurdles to 13.29 seconds at the 1995 World Championships in Athletics.

In addition he has competed at the 1996 and 2000 Olympic Games, as well as the 1994, 1998 and 2006 Commonwealth Games.

Competition record

In 2022, he was awarded the Australian Institute of Sport Athlete Community Engagement Award.

References

 
Profile

1971 births
Living people
Australian male hurdlers
Olympic athletes of Australia
Athletes (track and field) at the 1996 Summer Olympics
Athletes (track and field) at the 2000 Summer Olympics
Athletes (track and field) at the 1990 Commonwealth Games
Athletes (track and field) at the 1994 Commonwealth Games
Athletes (track and field) at the 1998 Commonwealth Games
World Athletics Championships athletes for Australia
Australian Institute of Sport track and field athletes
Indigenous Australian Olympians
Indigenous Australian track and field athletes
Commonwealth Games medallists in athletics
Commonwealth Games silver medallists for Australia
Medallists at the 1994 Commonwealth Games